The British Museum Act 1753 (26 Geo 2 c 22) was an Act of the Parliament of Great Britain. The Act provided for the purchase of the Museum or Collection of Sir Hans Sloane and of the Harleian Collection of Manuscripts to be held in a new body, the British Museum.

The whole Act was repealed by section 13(5) of, and Schedule 4 to, the British Museum Act 1963. Bylaws, ordinances, statutes or rules in force immediately before the commencement of the British Museum Act 1963 under section 14 or 15 of the British Museum Act 1753 are not invalidated by the repeal of the British Museum Act 1753, but have effect in relation to each Museum, with such modifications as may be necessary in consequence of the provisions of the British Museum Act 1963, as if they were rules made by the Trustees of that Museum under paragraph 5 of the First Schedule to the British Museum Act 1963.

See also
British Museum Act

References
Halsbury's Statutes,

Great Britain Acts of Parliament 1753
British Museum Acts
1750s in London